John Landry (born December 22, 1969) is a Canadian country music artist. Landry's debut album, Forever Took Too Long, was released in 1999 by Spin Records. Its first two singles, "There You Were" and "Bit by Bit," both reached the Top 10 of the Canadian Country Singles chart. Landry was nominated for a 2000 Juno Award for Best Country Male Artist.

Landry entertained on the country stage at the 2003 Palmer Rapids Twin Festival in Ontario.

Discography

Studio albums

Singles

Guest singles

Music videos

References

External links
Official Site

1969 births
Canadian male singer-songwriters
Canadian country singer-songwriters
Living people
Musicians from Montreal